The Lomaiviti (pronounced ) archipelago of Fiji consists of seven main islands and a number of smaller ones. The largest town, with a population of 1,131 in 2007, is Levuka, which was Fiji's first modern town and served as the capital from 1871 to 1877.

History 
The first known European sighting of the Lomaiviti Group was recorded in May 1789 by Captain William Bligh, who was on his epic voyage in a lifeboat to Timor having been cast adrift by his crew in the Mutiny on the Bounty.

The islands of Koro, Batiki, and Gau were seized by the United States Navy in 1867 as security for a long-standing debt owed to the United States consul John Brown Williams by Seru Epenisa Cakobau, the Vunivalu (Paramount Chief) of Bau Island who claimed to be King of Fiji. This debt was one of the factors contributing to Cakobau's decision to cede Fiji to the United Kingdom in 1874, just three years after achieving his decades-long dream of uniting Fiji's myriad islands and tribes under his authority.

Politics 
Lomaiviti comprises one of the fourteen provinces of Fiji, called Lomaiviti Province.

Notable Lomaivitians 
Well-known natives of Lomaiviti include Mosese Qionibaravi CMG (10 September 1938 – 22 September 1987) was a civil servant and politician. He served as a member of the House of Representatives from 1973 until his death, also holding the offices of Speaker of the House, Minister of Foreign Affairs, Tourism and Finance, and Deputy Prime Minister. Simione Kaitani, a former Minister (2001–2006) in the government of Prime Minister Laisenia Qarase and, as of June 2006, the manager of government business in the House of Representatives as Leader of the House. Former Deputy Prime Minister Taufa Vakatale and the well-known Minister for Home Affairs, Josefa Vosanibola, is also from Lomaiviti.

See also 

 List of islands

References

External links 

Lomaiviti Province
Archipelagoes of Fiji
Archipelagoes of the Pacific Ocean